Sue Price (born March 29, 1965, in Mount Prospect, Illinois, United States) is an American professional bodybuilder and actress, probably best known for playing Alex Sinclair in the Nemesis film series, a character inspired by the movie's original hero, Alex Rain, a member of the LAPD.

She attended  Lions Park Elementary, Lincoln Junior High School, and Prospect High School before graduating from Northern Illinois University, in DeKalb, Illinois. While there, she developed an interest in bodybuilding. Following this, Sue briefly lived in Chicago's Northwest suburbs before moving to the west coast to further her bodybuilding career and would later marry her partner.  They divorced and Sue now resides in Southern California with her long-time boyfriend and their two children.

Sue had a limited run as a film star, being cast as the heroine Alex Sinclair in the Albert Pyun films Nemesis 2: Nebula, Nemesis 3: Prey Harder and Nemesis 4: Death Angel and in Dustin Ferguson film's Nemesis 5 The New Model, House of Pain and Robowoman.

Bodybuilding career

Contest history
1990 NPC Nationals - 5th (LW)
1991 NPC Nationals - 5th (LW)
1992 NPC Nationals - 5th (LW)
1993 NPC Nationals - 1st (LW and overall)
1994 IFBB Jan Tana Classic - 1st
1994 IFBB Ms. Olympia - 6th
1995 IFBB Ms. Olympia - 4th

References

External links
 

Living people
American female bodybuilders
American film actresses
1965 births
Professional bodybuilders
21st-century American women